Turritopsis dohrnii, also known as the immortal jellyfish, is a species of small, biologically immortal jellyfish found worldwide in temperate to tropic waters. It is one of the few known cases of animals capable of reverting completely to a sexually immature, colonial stage after having reached sexual maturity as a solitary individual. Others include the jellyfish Laodicea undulata and species of the genus Aurelia.

Like most other hydrozoans, T. dohrnii begin their lives as tiny, free-swimming larvae known as planulae. As a planula settles down, it gives rise to a colony of polyps that are attached to the sea floor. All the polyps and jellyfish arising from a single planula are genetically identical clones. The polyps form into an extensively branched form, which is not commonly seen in most jellyfish. Jellyfish, also known as medusae, then bud off these polyps and continue their life in a free-swimming form, eventually becoming sexually mature. When sexually mature, they have been known to prey on other jellyfish species at a rapid pace. If the T. dohrnii jellyfish is exposed to environmental stress, physical assault, or is sick or old, it can revert to the polyp stage, forming a new polyp colony. It does this through the cell development process of transdifferentiation, which alters the differentiated state of the cells and transforms them into new types of cells.

Theoretically, this process can go on indefinitely, effectively rendering the jellyfish biologically immortal, although in practice individuals can still die. In nature, most Turritopsis dohrnii are likely to succumb to predation or disease in the medusa stage without reverting to the polyp form.

The capability of biological immortality with no maximum lifespan makes T. dohrnii an important target of basic biological, aging and pharmaceutical research.

Taxonomy

The species was formerly considered conspecific with T. nutricula before being reclassified as a separate species. It was named in 1883 in honour of Anton Dohrn, the founder of the Stazione Zoologica Anton Dohrn in Naples.

Description 

The mesoglea in the walls of the bell is uniformly thin, except for some thickening at the apex. The relatively large stomach is bright red and has a cruciform shape in cross section. Young specimens 1 mm in diameter have only eight tentacles evenly spaced out along the edge, whereas adult specimens have 80–90 tentacles. The medusa (jellyfish) is free-living in the plankton. Dense nerve net cells are also present in the epidermis in the cap. They form a large ring-like structure above the radial canal commonly presented in cnidarians.

Turritopsis dohrnii also has a bottom-living polyp form, or hydroid, which consists of stolons that run along the substrate and upright branches with feeding polyps that can produce medusa buds. These polyps develop over a few days into tiny 1 mm medusae, which are liberated and swim free from the parent hydroid colony.

Until a recent genetic study, it was thought that Turritopsis rubra and Turritopsis nutricula were the same. It is not known whether or not T. rubra medusae can also transform back into polyps.

Distribution and invasion 

Turritopsis is believed to have originated in the Pacific, but has spread all over the world through trans-Arctic migrations, and has speciated into several populations that are easy to distinguish morphologically, but whose species distinctions have recently been verified by a study and comparison of mitochondrial ribosomal gene sequences. Turritopsis are found in temperate to tropical regions in all of the world's oceans. Turritopsis is believed to be spreading across the world through ballast water discharge. Unlike other species invasions which caused serious economic and ecological consequences, T. dohrnii's invasion around the world was unnoticed due to their tiny size and innocuity. "We are looking at a worldwide silent invasion", said Smithsonian Tropical Marine Institute scientist Dr. Maria Miglietta.

Life cycle 

The eggs develop in gonads of female medusae, which are located in the walls of the manubrium (stomach). Mature eggs are presumably spawned and fertilized in the sea by sperm produced and released by male medusae, as is the case for most hydromedusae. However, the related species Turritopsis rubra seems to retain fertilized eggs until the planula stage. Fertilized eggs develop into planula larvae, which settle onto the sea floor (or even the rich marine communities that live on floating docks), and develop into polyp colonies (hydroids). The hydroids bud new jellyfishes, which are released at about one millimetre in size and then grow and feed in the plankton, becoming sexually mature after a few weeks (the exact duration depends on the ocean temperature; at  it is 25 to 30 days and at  it is 18 to 22 days). Medusae of T. dohrnii are able to survive between 14 °C  and 25 °C.

Biological immortality 

Most jellyfish species have a relatively fixed lifespan, which varies by species from hours to many months (long-lived mature jellyfish spawn every day or night; the time is also fairly fixed and species-specific). The medusa of Turritopsis dohrnii is the only form known to have developed the ability to return to a polyp state, by a specific transformation process that requires the presence of certain cell types (tissue from both the jellyfish bell surface and the circulatory canal system).

Experiments have revealed that all stages of the medusae, from newly released to fully mature individuals, can transform back into polyps under the conditions of starvation, sudden temperature change, reduction of salinity, and artificial damage of the bell with forceps or scissors. The transforming medusa is characterized first by deterioration of the bell, mesoglea, and tentacles. All immature medusa (with 12 tentacles at most) then turned into a cyst-like stage and then transformed into stolons and polyps. However, about 20%-40% of mature medusa went into the stolons and polyps stage without passing the cyst-like stage. Polyps were formed after 2 days since stolons had developed and fed on food. Polyps further multiply by growing additional stolons, branches, and then polyps to form colonial hydroids. In the experiment, they would eventually transform into stolons and polyps and begin their lives once again, even without environmental changes or injury.

This ability to reverse the biotic cycle (in response to adverse conditions) is unique in the animal kingdom. It allows the jellyfish to bypass death, rendering Turritopsis dohrnii potentially biologically immortal. The process has not been observed in their natural habitat, in part because the process is quite rapid and because field observations at the right moment are unlikely. Regardless, most individual medusae are likely to fall victim to the general hazards of life as mesoplankton, including being eaten by predators or succumbing to disease.

The species' cell development method of transdifferentiation has inspired scientists to find a way to make stem cells using this process for renewing damaged or dead tissue in humans.

Ecology

Diet 
Turritopsis dohrnii are a carnivorous species that commonly feed on zooplankton. Their diet mainly consists of plankton, fish eggs and small mollusks. T. dohrnii ingests food and excretes waste through the mouth. T. dohrnii hunts by using its tentacles as it drifts through the water.  Its tentacles, which contain stinging cells called nematocysts, spread and sting its prey. The tentacles can then flex to direct its prey to the mouth. T. dohrnii, like other jellyfish, may use its bell to catch its prey.  T. dohrnii's bell will expand, sucking in water, as it propels itself to swim.  This expansion of the bell brings potential prey in closer reach of the tentacles.

Predation 
Turritopsis dohrnii, like other jellyfish, are preyed on most commonly by other jellyfish.  Other predators of T. dohrnii include sea anemones, tuna, sharks, swordfish, sea turtles, and penguins. Many species prey on T. dohrnii and other jellyfish due to their simple composition. They are only approximately 5% matter, and the remaining part is composed of water.  They are composed of three layers. An outer layer (the epidermis), a middle layer (mesoglea; a thick, jelly-like substance), and an inner layer (gastrodermis).

Habitat 
Turritopsis dohrnii was first discovered in the Mediterranean Sea, but has since spread worldwide. T. dohrnii is generally found living in temperate to tropical waters. They can be found in marinas or docks, on vessel hulls, and on the ocean floor. They typically live in a salinity range of polyhaline (18-30 PSU) and euhaline (30-40 PSU).

Genomic analysis 
Genomic analyses such as sequence analysis on mRNA or mitochondria DNA have been employed to investigate its lifecycle. mRNA analysis of each life stage showed that a stage-specific gene in the medusae stage is expressed tenfold more than in other stages. This gene is relative to a Wnt signal that can induce a regeneration process upon injury.

Analysis of nucleotide sequence homologs and protein homologs identified Nemopsis bachei as the species' closest relative. None of the closely related species display biological immortality.

In 2022, a study reported the key molecular mechanisms of rejuvenation they found in a comparison of the newly presented genomes of this biologically immortal  jellyfish and a similar but non-rejuvenating jellyfish, involving e.g. DNA replication and repair, and stem cell renewal.

Culturing

Keeping T. dohrnii in captivity is quite difficult. Currently, only one scientist, Shin Kubota from Kyoto University, has managed to sustain a group of these jellyfish for a prolonged period of time. The plankton must be inspected daily to ensure that they have properly digested the Artemia cysts they are being fed.
Kubota reported that during a two-year period, his colony rebirthed itself 11 times. Kubota regularly appears on Japanese television to talk about his immortal jellyfish and has recorded several songs about them, often singing them at the end of his conference presentations.

See also 
 Hydra – another kind of cnidarian that is claimed to be immortal
 List of longest-living organisms

References

Further reading 
 .
 
  .

External links 

 Cheating Death: The Immortal Life Cycle of Turritopsis
 Telomerase activity is not related to life-history stage in the jellyfish Cassiopea sp.
 Scientists are Close to Finding a Way to be Immortal

Oceaniidae
Immortality
Negligibly senescent organisms
Animals described in 1883